The 1997 Pittsburgh Steelers season was the franchise's 65th season as a professional sports franchise and as a member of the National Football League.

This season was considered a transitional year due to many key free agent losses in the offseason, as well as the first season of Kordell Stewart starting at quarterback.

The Steelers finished with an 11–5 record, their fourth consecutive AFC Central top seed, and their sixth straight playoff appearance. In doing so, Steelers head coach Bill Cowher tied Hall of Fame coach Paul Brown with most consecutive playoff appearances to start a head coaching career in the NFL—a record Cowher still co-owns with Brown, as the Steelers missed the playoffs the following year.

The Steelers had 572 rushing attempts in 1997, the most in the 1990s. Their 2,479 total rushing yards were the third-most of the decade by any team.

The Steelers went into the season introducing a new font style numbers on jerseys matching the ones they wear on the helmets and the Steelers logo patch on uniform. 

The Steelers would host the AFC Championship Game for the third time in four years; however, they would ultimately lose to the eventual Super Bowl champion Denver Broncos. That game was the last playoff appearance for the Steelers during the 1990s and they did not return to the postseason until 2001.

Offseason
The Steelers saw many key free-agents leave the team, the biggest being cornerback Rod Woodson, whose ten-year tenure with the team ended due to a dispute over money with the Rooney family. Woodson would sign with the San Francisco 49ers as a result, though the Steelers would see him again in the following four seasons afterward as a member of the rival Baltimore Ravens. Other free-agent losses included Chad Brown, Ernie Mills, Andre Hastings, Deon Figures, and Brentson Buckner, among others. The team did manage to keep its other prized free-agent besides Woodson, locking up Jerome Bettis (who they had acquired in a trade with the St. Louis Rams the year before) with a four-year deal.

The team also had a transition at quarterback. After pushing Bill Cowher play exclusively at quarterback, Kordell Stewart was handed the starting job and dropping his "Slash" role on the team. Stewart would have success with the team this season, but would be inconsistent afterwards.

The team also made some minor changes to the uniforms this season, the first changes since gold pants were adopted as part of the white jerseys in 1972. The jersey numbers, previously having the old-style block numbering, were switched to the rounder style (Futura Condensed) as seen on the helmets. In addition, the Steelers logo was added to the left shoulder and the names became single color (black) fonts on the white away jersey. The names returned to gold on black the following year. The uniforms have remained the same since these changes as of 2007.

NFL Draft

Personnel

Staff

Notable additions include Paul Wiggins and Mike Vrabel.

Roster

Season

Preseason

Schedule

Regular season

Schedule 

Note: Intra-division opponents are in bold text.

Game summaries

Week 1 (Sunday August 31, 1997): vs. Dallas Cowboys 

at Three Rivers Stadium, Pittsburgh, Pennsylvania

 Game time: 1:00 pm EDT
 Game weather: 74 °F (Partly Sunny)
 Game attendance: 60,396
 Referee: Jerry Markbreit
 TV announcers: (FOX) Pat Summerall (play by play), John Madden (color commentator), Pam Oliver (sideline reporter)

Scoring drives:

 Dallas – Miller 12 pass from Aikman (Cunningham kick)
 Dallas – Irvin 42 pass from Aikman (Cunningham kick)
 Dallas – FG Cunningham 52
 Dallas – Irvin 15 pass from Aikman (Cunningham kick)
 Dallas – FG Cunningham 24
 Dallas – Johnston 13 pass from Aikman (Cunningham kick)
 Dallas – FG Cunningham 28
 Pittsburgh – Bruener 4 pass from Stewart (N. Johnson kick)

Week 2 (Sunday September 7, 1997): vs. Washington Redskins 

at Three Rivers Stadium, Pittsburgh, Pennsylvania

 Game time: 1:00 pm EDT
 Game weather: 74 °F (Partly Sunny)
 Game attendance: 58,059
 Referee: Ron Blum
 TV announcers: (FOX) Dick Stockton (play by play), Matt Millen (color commentator), Pam Oliver (sideline reporter)

Scoring drives:

 Pittsburgh – Stewart 1 run (N. Johnson kick)
 Washington – FG Blanton 37
 Washington – Mitchell 97 kickoff return (Blanton kick)
 Washington – FG Blanton 28
 Pittsburgh – Bettis 1 run (N. Johnson kick)

Week 3 (Sunday September 14, 1997): Bye Week

Week 4 (Monday September 22, 1997): at Jacksonville Jaguars 

at Alltel Stadium, Jacksonville, Florida

 Game time: 9:00 pm EDT
 Game weather: 
 Game attendance: 73,016
 Referee: Gerry Austin
 TV announcers: (ABC) Al Michaels (play by play), Frank Gifford & Dan Dierdorf (color commentators), Lynn Swann (sideline reporter)

Scoring drives:

 Jacksonville – Means 1 run (Hollis kick)
 Pittsburgh – Stewart 6 run (N. Johnson kick)
 Jacksonville – Smith 11 pass from Brunell (Hollis kick)
 Jacksonville – FG Hollis 20
 Pittsburgh – Thigpen 4 pass from Stewart (N. Johnson kick)
 Jacksonville – FG Hollis 45
 Pittsburgh – Bruener 1 pass from Stewart (N. Johnson kick)
 Jacksonville – FG Hollis 27
 Jacksonville – Hudson 58 blocked field goal return (Hollis kick)

Week 5 (Sunday September 28, 1997): vs. Tennessee Oilers 

at Three Rivers Stadium, Pittsburgh, Pennsylvania

 Game time: 1:00 pm EDT
 Game weather: 67 °F (Cloudy)
 Game attendance: 57,507
 Referee: Bernie Kukar
 TV announcers: (NBC) Jim Donovan (play by play), Beasley Reece (color commentator)

Scoring drives:

 Pittsburgh – Stewart 7 run (N. Johnson kick)
 Pittsburgh – FG Johnson 48
 Pittsburgh – Gildon 12 fumble return (N. Johnson kick)
 Tennessee – FG Del Greco 37
 Pittsburgh – Bruener 18 pass from Stewart (N. Johnson kick)
 Pittsburgh – Stewart 2 run (N. Johnson kick)
 Tennessee – FG Del Greco 47
 Tennessee – FG Del Greco 26
 Pittsburgh – FG N. Johnson 25
 Pittsburgh – FG N. Johnson 44
 Tennessee – Wycheck 10 pass from McNair (Wycheck pass from McNair)
 Tennessee – Davis 11 pass from McNair (Del Greco kick)

Week 6 (Sunday October 5, 1997): at Baltimore Ravens 

at Memorial Stadium, Baltimore, Maryland

 Game time: 1:00 pm EDT
 Game weather: 
 Game attendance: 64,421
 Referee: Bill Carollo
 TV announcers: (NBC) Tom Hammond (play by play), Jim Kelly (color commentator)

Scoring drives:

 Baltimore – Green 22 pass from Testaverde (Stover kick)
 Baltimore – Morris 1 run (Stover kick)
 Baltimore – Kinchen 24 pass from Testaverde (Stover kick)
 Pittsburgh – Stewart 1 run (N. Johnson kick)
 Baltimore – FG Stover 34
 Pittsburgh – Blackwell 97 kickoff return (N. Johnson kick)
 Pittsburgh – C. Johnson 8 pass from Stewart (N. Johnson kick)
 Pittsburgh – Bruener 4 pass from Stewart (N. Johnson kick)
 Pittsburgh – C. Johnson 17 pass from Stewart (N. Johnson kick)
 Baltimore – Alexander 10 pass from Testaverde (Byner pass from Testaverde)
 Pittsburgh – Stewart 74 run (N. Johnson kick)
 Baltimore – Safety, Miller ran out of end zone

Week 7 (Sunday October 12, 1997): vs. Indianapolis Colts 

at Three Rivers Stadium, Pittsburgh, Pennsylvania

 Game time: 8:00 pm EDT
 Game weather: 66 °F (Clear)
 Game attendance: 57,925
 Referee: Tom White
 TV announcers: (TNT) Verne Lundquist (play by play), Pat Haden & Mark May (color commentators), Craig Sager (sideline reporter)

Scoring drives:

 Indianapolis – Harrison 18 pass from Harbaugh (Blanchard kick)
 Indianapolis – FG Blanchard 37
 Pittsburgh – FG N. Johnson 23
 Pittsburgh – Bettis 7 run (N. Johnson kick)
 Pittsburgh – Lake 38 fumble return (N. Johnson kick)
 Indianapolis – FG Blanchard 27
 Pittsburgh – Hawkins 28 pass from Tomczak (N. Johnson kick)
 Indianapolis – FG Blanchard 35
 Indianapolis – Stablein 5 pass from Harbaugh (pass failed)

Week 8 (Sunday October 19, 1997): at Cincinnati Bengals 

at Cinergy Field, Cincinnati

 Game time: 4:00 pm EDT
 Game weather: 
 Game attendance: 60,020
 Referee: Phil Luckett
 TV announcers: (NBC) Dan Hicks (play by play), Bob Trumpy & Jim Kelly (color commentators)

Scoring drives:

 Cincinnati – Carter 6 run (Pelfrey kick)
 Pittsburgh – Jones 11 pass from Stewart (pass failed)
 PIttsburgh – Bettis 1 run (N. Johnson kick)
 Pittsburgh – Thigpen 11 pass from Stewart (N. Johnson kick)
 Cincinnati – FG Pelfrey 33
 Pittsburgh – FG N. Johnson 43
 Pittsburgh – FG N. Johnson 32

Week 9 (Sunday October 26, 1997): vs. Jacksonville Jaguars 

at Three Rivers Stadium, Pittsburgh, Pennsylvania

 Game time: 4:00 pm EST
 Game weather: 48 °F (Light Rain)
 Game attendance: 57,011
 Referee: Gary Lane
 TV announcers: (NBC) Dick Enberg (play by play), Phil Simms & Paul Maguire (color commentators)

Scoring drives:

 Jacksonville – Jackson 8 pass from Brunell (Hollis kick)
 Jacksonville – FG Hollis 20
 Pittsburgh – Hawkins 28 pass from Stewart (N. Johnson kick)
 Pittsburgh – Stewart 1 run (N. Johnson kick)
 Jacksonville – Mitchell 3 pass from Brunell (Hollis kick)
 Pittsburgh – FG N. Johnson 19
 Pittsburgh – Bettis 17 pass from Stewart

Week 10 (Monday November 3, 1997): at Kansas City Chiefs 

at Arrowhead Stadium, Kansas City, Missouri

 Game time: 9:00 pm EST
 Game weather: 
 Game attendance: 78,301
 Referee: Ed Hochuli
 TV announcers: (ABC) Al Michaels (play by play), Frank Gifford & Dan Dierdorf (color commentators), Lynn Swann (sideline reporter)

Scoring drives:

 Pittsburgh – Hawkins 44 pass from Stewart (N. Johnson kick)
 Pittsburgh – FG N. Johnson 27
 Kansas City – FG Stoyanovich 35
 Kansas City – FG Stoyanovich 44
 Kansas City – Hughes 14 pass from Allen (Stoyanovich kick)

Week 11 (Sunday November 9, 1997): vs. Baltimore Ravens 

at Three Rivers Stadium, Pittsburgh, Pennsylvania

 Game time: 8:00 pm EST
 Game weather: 44 °F (Cloudy)
 Game attendance: 56,669
 Referee: Gary Lane
 TV announcers: (ESPN) Mike Patrick (play by play), Joe Theismann (color commentator), Ron Jaworski (sideline reporter)

Scoring drives:

 Pittsburgh – Bettis 1 run (N. Johnson kick)
 Pittsburgh – FG N. Johnson 52
 Pittsburgh – Stewart 1 run (N. Johnson kick)
 Pittsburgh – FG N. Johnson 22
 Pittsburgh – FG N. Johnson 39
 Pittsburgh – Thigpen 52 pass from Stewart (N. Johnson kick)
 Pittsburgh – Jones 1 run (N. Johnson kick)

Week 12 (Sunday November 16, 1997): vs. Cincinnati Bengals 

at Three Rivers Stadium, Pittsburgh, Pennsylvania

 Game time: 1:00 pm EST
 Game weather: 30 °F (Light Snow)
 Game attendance: 55,226
 Referee: Johnny Grier
 TV announcers: (NBC) Dan Hicks (play by play), Jim Kelly (color commentator)

Scoring drives:

 Pittsburgh – FG N. Johnson 34
 Pittsburgh – FG N. Johnson 25
 Pittsburgh – Thigpen 20 pass from Stewart (N. Johnson kick)
 Cincinnati – FG Pelfrey 25
 Pittsburgh – Bruener 5 pass from Stewart (N. Johnson kick)

Week 13 (Sunday November 23, 1997): at Philadelphia Eagles 

at Veterans Stadium, Philadelphia

 Game time: 1:00 pm EST
 Game weather: 
 Game attendance: 67,166
 Referee: Jerry Markbreit
 TV announcers: (NBC) Don Criqui (play by play), Jim Mora (color commentator)

Scoring drives:

 Philadelphia – Dunn 31 pass from Hoying (Boniol kick)
 Philadelphia – Fryar 8 pass from Hoying (Boniol kick)
 Pittsburgh – FG N. Johnson 46
 Pittsburgh – FG N. Johnson 40
 Philadelphia – FG Boniol 23
 Philadelphia – FG Boniol 35
 Pittsburgh – Bettis 19 pass from Stewart (N. Johnson kick)
 Philadelphia – FG Boniol 25
 Pittsburgh – Blackwell 30 pass from Stewart (N. Johnson kick)

Week 14 (Sunday November 30, 1997): at Arizona Cardinals 

at Sun Devil Stadium, Tempe, Arizona

 Game time: 4:00 pm EST
 Game weather: 
 Game attendance: 66,341
 Referee: Bob McElwee
 TV announcers: (NBC) Dan Hicks (play by play), Jim Kelly (color commentator)

Scoring drives:

 Pittsburgh – Bettis 2 run (N. Johnson kick)
 Arizona – FG Nedney 32
 Pittsburgh – FG N. Johnson 40
 Arizona – Sanders 3 pass from Plummer (Nedney kick)
 Pittsburgh – Bettis 7 run (N. Johnson kick)
 Arizona – Gedney 11 pass from Plummer (Nedney kick)
 Pittsburgh – FG N. Johnson 39
 Arizona – FG Nedney 19
 Pittsburgh – Bettis 10 run

Week 15 (Sunday December 7, 1997): vs. Denver Broncos 

at Three Rivers Stadium, Pittsburgh, Pennsylvania

 Game time: 1:00 pm EST
 Game weather: 36 °F (Flurries)
 Game attendance: 59,739
 Referee: Walt Coleman
 TV announcers: (NBC) Dick Enberg (play by play), Phil Simms & Paul Maguire (color commentators), Jim Gray (sideline reporter)

Scoring drives:

 Denver – R. Smith 37 pass from Elway (Elam kick)
 Pittsburgh – Thigpen 33 pass from Stewart (N. Johnson kick)
 Denver – Davis 3 run (Elam kick)
 Denver – R. Smith 25 pass from Elgay (Elam kick)
 Pittsburgh – Thigpen 69 pass from Stewart (N. Johnson kick)
 Pittsburgh – Thigpen 21 pass from Stewart (N. Johnson kick)
 Denver – FG Elam 35
 Pittsburgh – Stewart 4 run (N. Johnson kick)
 Pittsburgh – Stewart 9 run (N. Johnson kick)

Week 16 (Saturday December 13, 1997): at New England Patriots 

at Foxboro Stadium, Foxborough, Massachusetts

 Game time: 4:00 pm EST
 Game weather: 
 Game attendance: 60,013
 Referee: Mike Carey
 TV announcers: (NBC) Dick Enberg (play by play), Phil Simms & Paul Maguire (color commentators), Jim Gray (sideline reporter)

Scoring drives:

 New England – Coates 18 pass from Bledsoe (Vinatieri kick)
 New England – Gash 1 pass from Bledsoe (Vinatieri kick)
 Pittsburgh – Stewart 1 run (N. Johnson kick)
 Pittsburgh – FG N. Johnson 36
 Pittsburgh – FG N. Johnson 34
 New England – Meggett 49 pass from Bledsoe (Vinatieri kick)
 Pittsburgh – Bruener 1 pass from Stewart (Thigpen pass from Stewart)
 Pittsburgh – FG N. Johnson 31

Week 17 (Sunday December 21, 1997): at Tennessee Oilers 

at Liberty Bowl Memorial Stadium, Memphis, Tennessee

 Game time: 1:00 pm EST
 Game weather: 
 Game attendance: 50,677
 Referee: Phil Luckett
 TV announcers: (NBC) Charlie Jones (play by play), Bob Trumpy (color commentator)

Scoring drives:

 Tennessee – FG Del Greco 34
 Pittsburgh – FG N. Johnson 23
 Tennessee – Thomas 25 run (Del Greco kick)
 Tennessee – FG Del Greco 29
 Tennessee – FG Del Greco 26
 Pittsburgh – FG N. Johnson 36

Standings

Playoffs

Game summaries 

Both of the Steelers post-season matchups were rematches from the regular season. The Steelers had a first-round bye, then faced the AFC East champion (and defending AFC champion) New England Patriots at home. The game, which was a homecoming for young Patriots players & Pittsburgh area natives Ty Law and Curtis Martin (Martin was in fact playing in his last game with New England before signing with the New York Jets that offseason), was also a rematch of the previous year's AFC Divisional matchup, which took place in Foxborough.

After defeating the Pats, the Steelers would lose to the eventual Super Bowl XXXII champion Denver Broncos 24–21 in Elway's last trip to Pittsburgh.

AFC Divisional Playoff (Saturday January 3, 1998): vs. New England Patriots 

at Three Rivers Stadium, Pittsburgh, Pennsylvania

 Game time: 12:30 pm EST
 Game weather: 52 °F (Light Rain)
 Game attendance: 61,228
 Referee: Walt Coleman
 TV announcers: (NBC) Tom Hammond (play by play), Randy Cross (color commentator), James Lofton (sideline reporter)

Scoring drives:

 Pittsburgh – Stewart 40 run (N. Johnson kick)
 New England – FG Vinatieri 31
 New England – FG Vinatieri 46

AFC Championship Game (Sunday January 11, 1998): vs. Denver Broncos 

at Three Rivers Stadium, Pittsburgh, Pennsylvania

 Game time: 12:30 pm EST
 Game weather: 34 °F (Mostly Sunny)
 Game attendance: 61,382
 Referee: Ron Blum
 TV announcers: (NBC) Dick Enberg (play by play), Phil Simms & Paul Maguire (color commentators), Jim Gray & John Dockery (sideline reporters)

Scoring drives:

 Denver – Davis 8 run (Elam kick)
 Pittsburgh – Stewart 33 run (N. Johnson kick)
 Pittsburgh – Bettis 1 run (N. Johnson kick)
 Denver – FG Elam 43
 Denver – Griffith 16 pass from Elway (Elam kick)
 Denver – McCaffrey 1 pass from Elway (Elam kick)
 Pittsburgh – C. Johnson 15 pass from Stewart (N. Johnson kick)

Honors and awards

Pro Bowlers 

See: 1998 Pro Bowl

 No. 36 Jerome Bettis-Running back
 No. 37 Carnell Lake-Safety
 No. 63 Dermontti Dawson-Center
 No. 82 Yancey Thigpen-Wide receiver
 No. 93 Joel Steed-Nose tackle
 No. 99 Levon Kirkland-Inside linebacker

All-Pros

 Yancy Thigpen (Second-Team)
 Joel Steed (Pro Football Weekly First-Team All-AFC)
 Levon Kirkland (First-Team)
 Dermontti Dawson (First-Team)
 Carnell Lake (First-Team)
 Jerome Bettis (Second-Team)

References

External links
 1997 Pittsburgh Steelers season at Pro Football Reference 
 1997 Pittsburgh Steelers season statistics at jt-sw.com 

Pittsburgh Steelers seasons
Pittsburgh Steelers
AFC Central championship seasons
Pitts